Robert Comrie Turner,  (6 June 1920 – 26 January 2012) was a Canadian composer, radio producer, and music educator. He graduated with a bachelor's degree in music from McGill University in 1943. While there he studied with Douglas Clarke and Claude Champagne. He continued his studies briefly at Colorado College in 1947, where he met his wife, percussionist Sara Scott. They married in 1949. In 1947, Turner transferred to Peabody College in Nashville, Tennessee, where he studied with Roy Harris. He graduated in 1950 with a master's degree. During this time, Turner spent two summers studying with Herbert Howells and Gordon Jacob at the Royal College of Music and one summer at the Berkshire Music Center at Tanglewood studying with Olivier Messiaen. He returned to McGill University in 1951, graduating with a doctorate two years later.

Turner worked as a CBC Vancouver music producer 1952-68, where his responsibilities included the broadcasts of the CBC Vancouver Chamber Orchestra. He taught at the University of British Columbia 1955-7, at Acadia University 1968-9, and at the University of Manitoba 1969-85. He was appointed professor emeritus at the University of Manitoba upon his retirement in 1985. Several of his students have gone on to have successful careers including Peter Allen, Pat Carrabré, Jim Hiscott, Diana McIntosh and Glenn Buhr.

Among his numerous works are two operas: The Brideship (1967) and Vile Shadows (1983).

Turner was appointed a Member of the Order of Canada in 2002.

Turner died on 26 January 2012, in Winnipeg.

Robert Turner's family and friends published a memorial and archive website which includes tributes from students and colleagues, audio samples, a list of compositions, and an extensive bibliography. The website can be found at robert-turner.com.

Selected works 
Stage
 The Brideship, Opera in 1 act, 3 scenes (1966–1967); libretto by George Woodcock
 Vile Shadows, Opera in 2 acts for soloists and wind quintet (1982–1983, revised 1998); libretto after the play of the same name by Norman Newton

Orchestral
 Opening Night, Theatre Overture (1955)
 Lyric Interlude (1956)
 Nocturne (1956, 1965); original version for piano solo
 A Children's Overture (1958); suitable for youth and community orchestras
 The Pemberton Valley, Suite (1958)
 Symphony for Strings for string orchestra (1960)
 3 Episodes (1963)
 Moerae (1963)
 Eidolons, 12 Images for chamber orchestra (1972)
 Variations on "The Prairie Settlers's Song" (1974)
 Symphony in One Movement "Gift from the Sea", Symphony No. 2 (1983)
 Playhouse Music (1986)
 Shades of Autumn (1987)
 Manitoba Memoir for string orchestra (1989)
 Symphony No. 3 (1990)
 House of Shadows, A Symphonic Synthesis after the Opera Vile Shadows (1994)
 Diverti-memento for chamber orchestra (1997)
 Festival Dance (1997)

Band
 Robbins' Round, Concertino for jazz band (1959)

Concertante
 Concerto for 2 pianos and orchestra (1971)
 Chamber Concerto for bassoon and 17 instruments (1973)
 Capriccio Concertante for cello, piano and orchestra (1975)
 From a Different Country: Homage to Gabrieli for solo brass quintet and orchestra (1976)
 Encounters for soloists and orchestra (1985)
     Flutenanny, Encounter I for flute, string orchestra and harp
     Spring Greeting, Encounter II for clarinet, string orchestra and piano
     Shadows, Like Lost Souls, Encounter III for violin and orchestra
     A Great Quiet and a Still Home, Encounter IV for cello and orchestra
     Ebb Tide, Encounter V for voice (high or low) and orchestra; words by Marjorie Pickthall
     The Wind's and the Wave's Riot, Encounter VI for piano and orchestra
     Shepherd on the Make, Encounter VII for oboe, string orchestra and percussion
     The Old Sea's Pride, Encounter VIII for horn and orchestra
     The Strong Thunder of the Full Straits, Encounter IX for trombone and orchestra
 Concerto for viola and orchestra (1986–1987)
 A Group of Seven: Poems of Love and Nature by Canadian Poets for viola, narrator and orchestra (1991)

Chamber music
 String Quartet No. 1 (1949)
 Lament for flute, oboe, clarinet, bassoon and piano (1951)
 String Quartet No. 2 (1954)
 Sonata for violin and piano (1956)
 Little Suite for harp (1957)
 Vignette for clarinet, 2 violins, viola and cello (1958, revised 1988)
 Variations and Toccata for flute (piccolo), oboe, clarinet, bassoon, horn, 2 violins, viola, cello and double bass (1959)
 Serenade for flute, oboe, clarinet, horn and bassoon (1960)
 4 Fragments for 2 trumpets, horn and 2 trombones (1961)
 Fantasia for organ, brass quintet and timpani (1962)
 Diversities for violin, bassoon and piano (1967)
 Transition, Trio for violin, cello and piano (1969)
 Fantasy and Festivity for harp (1970)
 Nostalgia for soprano saxophone and piano (1972)
 String Quartet No. 3 (1975)
 Lament for Linos, An Elegiac Triptych for flute (piccolo), clarinet (E-flat clarinet), piano (celesta), prepared tape and slides (1978); words by Rainer Maria Rilke
 Shadow Pieces for flute, bassoon, violin, cello and piano (1981)
 Bitonal Wedding, 3 Fanfares for 2 trumpets (1997)

Keyboard
 Sonata Lyrica for piano (1955, revised 1963)
 Nocturne for piano (1956); orchestrated in 1965
 Dance of the Disenchanted for piano (1959, 1988)
 6 Voluntaries for organ (1959)
 A Merry-Mournful (Major-Minor) Mood for piano (1971)
 Wedding March for organ or piano (1977)
 Vestiges, 3 Pieces for piano (1987)

Vocal
 Eclogue: The Nymph's Reply to the Shepherd for voice, oboe (or flute, or clarinet, or violin), and harpsichord (or piano) (1958); words by Sir Walter Raleigh
 4 Songs for tenor and orchestra (1959)
 The Phoenix and the Turtle for mezzo-soprano, flute, bass clarinet, clarinet, string trio, celesta and harp (1964); words by William Shakespeare
 Suite in Homage to Melville for soprano, alto, viola and piano (1966); words by Herman Melville
 Four Songs for voice and orchestra (1969); words from Friday's Child by Wilfred Watson
 Johann's Gift to Christmas for narrator and orchestra (1972)
 Ebb Tide, Encounter V for voice (high or low) and orchestra (1985); words by Marjorie Pickthall
 Time for Three, 3 Songs for mezzo-soprano, viola and piano (1985); words by John Milton, Marjorie Pickthall and anonymous
 Four "Last Songs" for voice, violin and piano (1995); words by Francis Ledwidge

Choral
 2 Choral Pieces for mixed chorus (1952); words by Wallace Stevens and E. E. Cummings
 Mobile for mixed chorus and percussion (1960); words by Elder Olson
 Prophetic Song for female chorus a cappella (1961); words by Percy Bysshe Shelley
 The Third Day, Cantata for 2 sopranos, contralto, tenor, baritone, mixed chorus and orchestra (1962)
 The House of Christmas, 4 Carols for mixed chorus (1963); words by G. K. Chesterton
 5 Canadian Folk Songs from the Maritimes and Newfoundland for soprano and mixed chorus (1973)
 10 Canadian Folk Songs for voice and piano (1973) or voice and orchestra (1980)
 Amoroso Canto for mixed chorus a cappella (1978); words by Wallace Stevens, Paul Verlaine, Louis Dudek, Guillaume Apollinaire and Thomas Hardy
 River of Time for mixed chorus and orchestra (1994); words by Matthew Arnold

Television scores
 Object Matrimony, Television play (1958)
 The Pemberton Valley, Documentary (1958)
 Yosef Drenters, Documentary (1961)

References

External links 
 www.robert-turner.com (Memorial & Biographical Archive)
 Canadian Music Centre Biography
 University of Manitoba School Of Music Biography
  The Canadian Encyclopedia Biography

1920 births
2012 deaths
Canadian classical composers
Canadian opera composers
Members of the Order of Canada
Musicians from Montreal
Peabody College alumni
McGill University School of Music alumni
Academic staff of the University of British Columbia
Academic staff of Acadia University
Academic staff of the University of Manitoba
Canadian male classical composers
Male opera composers
20th-century Canadian composers
20th-century Canadian male musicians